Gordon Anderson (29 December 1897 – 23 May 1958) was an Australian politician. Born in Barkly, Victoria, he was educated at state schools in Sydney before becoming an employee of New South Wales Government Railways. He was an official in the Railways Salaried Officers' Union and in the Labor Party, and was elected to Waverley Municipal Council, serving four terms as the first Labor Mayor of the Council. In 1949 he was elected to the Australian House of Representatives for the Labor Party, representing the new seat of Kingsford-Smith. He held the seat until his retirement in 1955; he died in 1958.

References

1897 births
1958 deaths
Australian Labor Party members of the Parliament of Australia
Members of the Australian House of Representatives for Kingsford Smith
Members of the Australian House of Representatives
Australian trade unionists
20th-century Australian politicians
Mayors of Waverley, New South Wales